Ron Lee is a former professional American football player who played running back for four seasons for the Baltimore Colts.

References

1953 births
American football running backs
Baltimore Colts players
West Virginia Mountaineers football players
Living people
People from Bellaire, Ohio